Split Film Festival or Split International Festival of New Film, is one of the oldest film and video festivals in Croatia that showcases new, creative, personal, radical works of all styles, themes, genres and lengths, whether film, or new media, preferably from outside the mainstream. Festival's previous guests included Chris Marker, Jonas Mekas, Jean Marie Straub & Daniele Huillot, late Stan Brakhage, Claire Denis, Bela Tarr, Lars von Trier and Cyrus Frisch.

The Festival presents screenings of selected films, videos, interactive media, installations, performances, retrospectives workshops, discussions and festival's catalogue.

Split Film Festival takes place every Summer in Split, Croatia. The Festival is open to all new, innovative, personal, experimental film, radical, subversive etc. work (film, video and new media) of all genres and lengths, preferably from outside the mainstream, whether it was made on a shoestring budget or is a studio release.

External links
http://www.splitfilmfestival.hr/
https://www.youtube.com/user/splitfilmfest
http://www.new.facebook.com/group.php?gid=19161272803&ref=mf

Experimental film festivals
Film festivals in Croatia
Recurring events established in 1996
1996 establishments in Croatia
Film Festival
Summer events in Croatia